Trischalis absconditana is a moth in the family Erebidae. It was described by Francis Walker in 1863. It is found in Assam in India and in Sri Lanka.

Description
The head, thorax and abdomen are yellowish. Forewings yellow with a broad fuscous band below the costa which commencing as a patch on the inner basal area and curving round to outer angle. Hindwings are pale yellow.

References

Moths described in 1863
Nudariina